Kramolín or Kramolin may refer to:

Places
Kramolín (Plzeň-South District), a municipality and village in the Plzeň Region, Czech Republic
Kramolín (Třebíč District), a municipality and village in the Vysočina Region, Czech Republic
Kramolin, a village in the Gabrovo Province, Bulgaria
Kramolin Cove, a cove in Antarctica

People
Josef Kramolín, Czech painter